A Monster Christmas or Abominable Christmas is a 2012 American animated children's film, made for television. Directed by Chad Van De Keere for Kickstart Productions, it features the voices of Isabella Acres, Drake Bell, Emilio Estevez and Ray Liotta. The film is about two young abominable snow children who escape the capture of an evil scientist and take up residence with a family. The film was screened at the 2013 Foyle Film Festival.

Cast
The following actors provided their voice for the characters:

Ariel Winter as Abby Abominable
Isabella Acres as Lilly Winterbottom
Nolan Gould as Adam Abominable
Drake Bell as Matt Winterbottom
Ray Liotta as Abominable Dad 
Emilio Estevez as Mr. Winterbottom
Matthew Lillard as Dogcatcher
Jane Lynch as Margaret Knowhow

Reception
Cleaver Patterson, writing for Starburst Magazine wrote: "It's quite charming, with its story of a hapless father doing his best to bring up his unruly offspring single-handedly after his wife has died. The characters however appear stereotypically irksome – an overprotective parent, feisty young daughter, know-it-all older brother, as well as bumbling baddies and buffoonish representatives of the law – whilst the storyline offers little opportunity other than to involve everyone in endless misunderstanding-induced chases. The animation – though by no means as bad as the recent Scottish abomination Sir Billi – is not much above the standard you'd expect from a made-for-television film, which A Monster Christmas was originally intended as."

References

External links
 

2012 television films
2012 films
2010s animated short films
American Christmas films
Animated Christmas films
Christmas television films
2010s English-language films